The University Chorus (Spanish: Pasa la tuna) is a 1960 Spanish musical film directed by José María Elorrieta.

Cast

References

Bibliography 
 Bentley, Bernard. A Companion to Spanish Cinema. Boydell & Brewer, 2008.

External links 
 

1960 musical films
Spanish musical films
1960 films
1960s Spanish-language films
Films directed by José María Elorrieta
1960s Spanish films